"Electric" is a song recorded by Swedish artist Leila K. It is produced by Denniz Pop and Max Martin, and released as a single in late 1995. In 1996, it was included on her third album, Manic Panic. The chorus is sung by Swedish singer Jessica Folcker. The single peaked at number 2 in Finland, number 8 in Sweden and number 37 in Belgium. On the Eurochart Hot 100, it reached number 86. Outside Europe, it was a Top 20 hit in Israel, peaking at number 18.

Composition 
The song's chorus has the same melody as Shannon's 1984 dance hit "Give Me Tonight". Chris Barbosa and Ed Chisolm share songwriting credits for the song. In the 2020 book, Move Your Body (2 The 90s): Unlimited Eurodance, writer Juha Soininen noted, "It also breaks the pattern of male raps: Leila raps and Jessica Folcker has the refrain. In its ferocity and aggressiveness, it encapsulates the best sides of eurodance."

Critical reception 
Pan-European magazine Music & Media wrote that the Denniz Pop-produced song "shows that Leila K is still "The First Lady Of Rap"."

Music video 
The music video for "Electric" was directed by Ragnar Jansson. In the video, Leila K and Jessica Folcker are dancing in a factory setting. Two kendōka practice kendo. It was nominated for a Swedish Dance Award in 1997.

Track listing 
 "Electric" (Short Version) - 3:33
 "Electric" (Long Version) - 5:54
 "Electric" (Housecontrol Remix) - 9:29

Versions of the song 
 Short Version 3:35
 Long Version 5:55
 Vocal Remix 6:12
 Merlyn's Dub Mix 6:01
 Vocal Remix 6:12
 Power Mix 5:16
 Housecontrol Remix 9:29

Charts

Weekly charts

Year-end charts

References 

1995 singles
Leila K songs
Songs written by Herbie Crichlow
Songs written by Max Martin
Songs written by Denniz Pop
Song recordings produced by Denniz Pop
Song recordings produced by Max Martin
Songs written by Chris Barbosa
Mega Records singles
Songs written by Leila K